Child Care Licensing in North Carolina has been regulated by state statute since 1971. The current system uses a 5-star rating system that awards points based on programming quality. The more points, the higher the rating and thus, the more 'stars' issued. If someone is providing child care of more than two children who are not related to them for more than four hours per day, the provider needs to be licensed by the State.

History
While all states have some regulations for center-based care, the rules differ and may span from simple health-related standards to more comprehensive rating systems that factor in child development and early childhood education guidelines. North Carolina's early regulatory attempts for Day care licenses were confusing to parents and difficult to navigate. The state had a two-tier system that listed centers who met minimum requirements as a level "A" provider. This was confusing to parents who believed that an "A" rating was the highest category available. In 1999, the state moved to the star system citing better clarification for parents and specific standards providers could strive to obtain.  The newer star ratings were also meant to help recognize providers for their level of care. One star is the lowest rating while five stars is the highest.

The system mandates both family centers (also called home child care) and child care centers located in commercial spaces. According to North Carolina statute:

Family or home child care can have a maximum of five preschool children in care and may reach the maximum of eight if three of those children are school-aged.
Child Care Centers provide for more than five preschool children and will be limited to a maximum based on total square footage of the center (indoor and outdoor) as well as sanitation, fire and possible zoning regulations that may be area-specific.

Before switching regulatory guidelines in 1999, the Frank Porter Graham Child Development Institute/University of North Carolina at Chapel Hill (FPG/UNC)was commissioned to evaluate whether the newly adopted star system would effectively mirror child care center quality. The team collected data from over 200 randomly selected child care centers across the state (not family care centers) just months before the new rules went into effect. The data collected was based on interviews from child care center directors and direct observations of child development practices based on Environment Ratings Scales (ERS). These scales were developed in 1980 by the FPG/UNC, improved by data over the years and now are considered a national standard.  These standards included daily routines and activities as well as materials used in the classroom, interactions between teachers and students and the education and wages of teachers. The group then revisited the sample centers after the new star licensing rules took effect. Of the more than 200 centers originally included in the 1999 data collection, 84 child care centers had received the new star ratings by December 2000. Of these 84, the ERS measurements designated in 1999 were directly related to the star rating granted by the State of North Carolina in 2000. Therefore, early evidence showed that the new star rating system directly correlated to quality of child care.

Since implementation, studies of the licensing program have been commissioned by North Carolina to evaluate the success of the program. National child care-related organizations such as the National Association of Child Care Research and Referral Agencies also provide reports cards on regulatory measures for North Carolina and other states.

Concluding 2012, there were a total of 7646 licensed centers in North Carolina providing care to 251,798 children.

How the star rating system works

All centers licensed through the State of North Carolina must pass a one-star rating; however, both Home Care Centers and Child Care Centers can voluntarily choose to become licensed at the higher levels. There are certain exemptions to the regulatory rules. These exemptions include:

 if the children within the home are related to each other and there is no more than two non-related children in the same care;
 recreational programs that are run less than four consecutive months in a year;
 programs that specialize in activities or instruction such as organized clubs, art or music lessons;
 Drop-in or short-term care while the parents participate in a non-employment function such as health clubs, shopping, resorts or churches;
 Public School programs or nonpublic schools accredited by the Southern Association of Colleges and Schools as long as they operate for less than 6.5 hours per day; 
 Vacation Bible Schools;
 Military bases, the Cherokee Indian Reservation or any federal property over which the federal government has jurisdiction or control.

If an individual in North Carolina is considering taking care of two or more children who are not related to them for more than four hours a day and do NOT qualify for an exemption, the home or center must be regulated through the State. At a minimum, both family care and child care centers must have safe practices regarding transportation and discipline. NC law also specifies that parents have a right to enter the premises at any time while their child is in care at either a home or center-based facility.  In addition to limits as to the number of children allowed in a home-based care center, a home being used for child care must be operated by someone deemed mentally competent over the age of 21. Likewise, all providers within that home must have undergone a criminal check and have current CPR and SIDS training. Child care centers have larger requirements such as curriculum and activity plans, health and safety certifications as well as space and equipment provisions.

Providers who receive complaints substantiated by the North Carolina Department of Health and Human Services Department of Child Development and Early Education could face fines or revocation of licensing. While the NC Division of Child Development and Early Education has statutory authority relating to childcare licenses, all providers must also pass local inspections including reviews by a local health department, fire and safety officials and child care nurses for immunization checks.

Becoming licensed in North Carolina

To become a licensed provider in North Carolina, an application must be filed with the North Carolina Division for Early Child Development and Early Education. This division is a part of the North Carolina Department of Health and Human Services. There are two separate processes: one for a Family Child Care Home center and another for Child Care centers.

Child care centers are assigned ratings by the State of North Carolina based on standards developed by the North Carolina Rated License Assessment Project (NCRLAP). Each rating is valid for three years; however, centers can apply to be assessed for a higher rating at any time. The NCLAP is housed at UNC Greensboro and employs licensing consultants and regional coordinators across the state. When a center requests an assessment, preliminary information is gathered prior to scheduling an organized site visit.

During a site visit, two licensing agents observe the center - often in multiple classrooms and settings. Providers have access to many of the standards to be reviewed during the visit through the agency's "Additional Note s" feature so each center is aware of the expectations during a licensing visit. These "Additional Notes" are used as a primary resource for the assessment process in North Carolina.  The classroom observation is supplemented by an interview with caregivers. Detailed reports are then provided by the license assessor within two weeks of the visit.

Different standards are in place for different age groups. These standards range from hours of operation, ratios of adults to children that must be maintained at all times and sanitation requirements.

 Infant/Toddler Environment Rating Scale (ITERS) is specific to centers with children aged birth to 30 months.
 Early Childhood Environment Rating Scale (ETERS) deals primarily with children over 2.4 years of age up to age 5.
 Family Child Care Rating Scale and Family Child Care Environment Rating Scale (FCCERS) is used for centers that house multiple age groups in a home environment.
 School-Age Care Environment Rating Scale (SACERS) is designed for centers who work with children aged 5 to 12.

Points earned during the process are in direct correlation to observations made by the licensing assessor; however, education of the educators are taken into consideration as well. For family child care homes, coursework in early childhood education is taken into account with an Associate degree in Early Childhood Education considered the highest level of coursework.  In child care centers, the more staff with early childhood education coursework or that show significant experience in the area, the higher the potential for point accrual toward licensing up to Bachelor's degrees.

North Carolina licensing rules in relation to other states

The 2010 US Census showed that nearly 7.4 million children under the age of five who had working mothers were in some form of care other than their parents. By elementary school age (considered ages 5 to 11) more than six percent of these children were home without adult supervision.

All 50 states within the U.S. have some safety regulations in place for child care; however, they vary greatly regarding laws and compliance. Federal law has often implemented child care for low-income families through initiatives like Head Start and public subsidies for child care, but regulatory measures outside of those programs fall to each individual state. Likewise, every state that does regulate child care facilities may have different views of what constitutes a child care center, exemptions from the regulations and oversight actions. For instance, North Carolina requires a license within a home center if there are more than two non-related children being cared for more than four hours per day. South Dakota does not require licensing until there are more than 12 children in the home. The variances in program rules range from education requirements for a lead teacher to health and safety inspections. There is also a contrast between states in oversight of the centers.

Statutory requirements within North Carolina continue to change from nuances in sanitation to how child care subsidies are administrated and paid throughout the state. As different advocacy groups highlight their causes such as child development research, childhood obesity or even after a death in child care is reported causing practices to be reviewed throughout the state, those issues are brought to state legislators for action.

References 

Child welfare in the United States